Staniszcze Małe  is a village in the administrative district of Gmina Kolonowskie, within Strzelce County, Opole Voivodeship, in south-western Poland.

The village has an approximate population of 700.

References

Villages in Strzelce County